Royal patronage may refer to:

 Fount of honour, a representative of a sovereign or formerly sovereign entity who, by virtue of his or her official position, has the exclusive prerogative of conferring legitimate titles of nobility and orders of chivalry to other persons
 Royal patronage in arts, commerce, etc.
 Patronato real
 Padroado